U.S. Route 19 (US 19) is a part of the U.S. Highway System that runs from Memphis, Florida to Erie, Pennsylvania.  In Virginia, the highway runs  between two pairs of twin cities: Bristol, Tennessee and Bristol, Virginia, at the Virginia–Tennessee state line, and Bluefield, Virginia and Bluefield, West Virginia, at the Virginia–West Virginia state line.  Between its endpoints, US 19 has lengthy concurrencies with US 11, US 58 Alternate, and US 460 during its course connecting Abingdon, Lebanon, and Tazewell within Washington, Russell, and Tazewell counties in Southwest Virginia.

Route description

Bristol to Abingdon
US 19 enters Virginia concurrent with US 11E at State Street, which follows the Virginia–Tennessee state line as the main street of Bristol, Virginia to the north and Bristol, Tennessee to the south and forms the easternmost part of SR 1 west of the intersection. The two U.S. Highways and SR 381 head north along Commonwealth Avenue, a four-lane divided highway that intersects Goode Street one block north of the state line; Goode Street carries US 421 and both US 11 Truck and US 19 Truck through the Bristol Commercial Historic District.  US 19, US 11E, US 421, and SR 381 meet the southern end of SR 113 at separate intersections: Cumberland Street carries northbound SR 113 east and Sycamore Street carries the westbound direction.  The four highways continue north to east–west Euclid Avenue, where US 11E has its northern terminus.  SR 381 continues north along Commonwealth Avenue to the southern end of I-381, a spur south from I-81.  Westbound Euclid Avenue heads west carrying northbound US 421 and southbound US 11W.  US 19 turns east to join US 11 on eastbound Euclid Avenue.

US 19 and US 11 head east as a two-lane divided boulevard through a residential area.  The street becomes undivided shortly before the U.S. Highways reach the northern end of SR 113 (Moore Street), which heads south toward Virginia Intermont College and downtown Bristol.  US 19 and US 11 continue northeast on Lee Highway, which here and in much of Virginia is a three-lane road with a center left-turn lane.  The highway meets I-81 and US 58 at a diamond interchange with a rakish angle.  US 19 and US 11 pass under Norfolk Southern Railway's Pulaski District and cross Beaver Creek before leaving the city of Bristol.  The two highways continue northeast through Washington County, where they pass Virginia Highlands Airport before entering the town of Abingdon.  At the west end of town, US 19 and US 11 intersect SR 140 (Jonesboro Road), a connector between the U.S. Highways and I-81 that also serves Virginia Highlands Community College.  The U.S. highways continue east as Main Street, which passes under the Norfolk Southern rail line before US 19 turns north onto Porterfield Highway.

Abingdon to Bluefield

US 19 heads northwest as a four-lane divided highway that is joined by US 58 Alternate (Russell Road) before leaving the town of Abingdon.  The two highways cross Walker Mountain and briefly follow the North Fork Holston River before following Moccasin Creek through Moccasin Gap between Clinch Mountain to the west and Brumley Mountain to the east.  US 19 and US 58 Alternate enter Russell County at Little Moccasin Gap a short distance east of where the highways diverge at Hansonville.  US 19 continues northeast by the village of Willis before reaching Lebanon.  At the southwest corner of the town, the U.S. Highway has a diamond interchange with US 19 Business (Main Street) and SR 660 (Mountain Road).  US 19 has a diamond interchange with SR 654 before meeting the eastern end of US 19 Business (Trail of the Lonesome Pine) east of Big Cedar Creek.

US 19 continues northeast as the Trail of the Lonesome Pine, which has an intersection with SR 80 (Hayters Gap Road) at the hamlet of Smithfield.  The two highways run concurrently to Rosedale, where SR 80 heads north as Red Bud Highway.  At Southwest Virginia Community College at the Russell–Tazewell County line, US 19 veers north through Wardell and crosses the Little River.  The U.S. Highway curves east again and meets US 460 (Governor George C. Peery Highway) at Claypool Hill.  US 19 and US 460 parallel the Clinch River and Norfolk Southern Railway's Clinch Valley District through Pounding Mill and Cliffield to the hamlet of Pisgah, where US 19 Business and US 460 Business head south as Crab Orchard Road toward Frog Level.

US 19 and US 460 become a freeway through the town of Tazewell that has diamond interchanges with SR 16 Alternate (Fairground Road) and SR 16 (Tazewell Avenue).  The freeway crosses the railroad and the Clinch River at its partial cloverleaf interchange with SR 61 (Riverside Drive).  North of Tazewell, US 19 and US 460 have a partial cloverleaf interchange with SR 645 (Cauitts Creek Road) and SR 678 (Market Street) before meeting the eastern end of the U.S. Highways' business routes, named Fincastle Turnpike, at a partial interchange where the highways cross over the Clinch Valley rail line.  US 19 and US 460 diverge as the local and express routes, respectively, through the twin towns of Bluefield, Virginia and Bluefield, West Virginia.  US 19 heads northeast from its trumpet interchange with US 460 and crosses the rail line into the town of Bluefield, where the highway reduces to a two-lane undivided road and follows Virginia Avenue.  After closely paralleling the rail line, at Greever Avenue, the U.S. Highway makes a right-angle turn north to continue on Virginia Avenue, then veers east, passing under the rail line at its junction with the Pocahontas District rail line.  US 19 has a pair of right-angle turns at its crossing of Beaverpond Creek just west of its intersection with SR 102 (College Avenue).  The U.S. Highway passes through downtown Bluefield, Virginia before crossing the state line into Bluefield, West Virginia, where the highway continues as Bluefield Avenue.

History
What is now US 19 was part of the original 1918 state highway system. It was part of State Route 10 from Bristol to Abingdon, a spur of SR 10 (designated State Route 106 in the 1923 renumbering and State Route 110 in the 1928 renumbering) from Abingdon to Hansonville, another spur of SR 10 from Hansonville to Lebanon, and State Route 11 from Lebanon to Bluefield. The spur from Hansonville to Lebanon was initially designated State Route 10Y. In the 1923 renumbering it was renumbered State Route 112 (as a spur of SR 11), and in the 1928 renumbering it became State Route 131. US 19 was added in the late 1920s, and in the 1933 renumbering the state routes were dropped.

Major intersections

See also

References

External links

Virginia Highways Project: US 19

 Virginia
19
U.S. Route 019
U.S. Route 019
U.S. Route 019
U.S. Route 019
Expressways in the United States
Virginia Byways